The 1959 Boston Red Sox season was the 59th season in the franchise's Major League Baseball history. The Red Sox finished fifth in the American League (AL) with a record of 75 wins and 79 losses, 19 games behind the AL champion Chicago White Sox.

Offseason 
1958 turned out to be Jimmy Piersall's final season with the Red Sox. On December 2, 1958, Piersall was traded to the Cleveland Indians in exchange for Gary Geiger and Vic Wertz.

Notable transactions 
 Prior to 1959 season: Mike Page was signed as an amateur free agent by the Red Sox.
 March 9, 1959: Bob Smith was traded by the Red Sox to the Chicago Cubs for Chuck Tanner.

Regular season 
 The 1959 season was the year that the color barrier was broken for the Red Sox. On July 21, Elijah "Pumpsie" Green became the first black player to play for the Red Sox. A week later, Earl Wilson became the first black pitcher to play for the team.
 Ted Williams would have an off year in his penultimate season, as he batted below .300.

Season standings

Record vs. opponents

Notable transactions 
 July 26, 1959: Bud Byerly was traded by the Red Sox to the San Francisco Giants for Billy Muffett and cash.
 September 9, 1959: Chuck Tanner was sold by Red Sox to Cleveland Indians.

Opening day lineup

Roster

Player stats

Batting

Starters by position 
Note: Pos = Position; G = Games played; AB = At bats; H = Hits; Avg. = Batting average; HR = Home runs; RBI = Runs batted in

Other batters 
Note: G = Games played; AB = At bats; H = Hits; Avg. = Batting average; HR = Home runs; RBI = Runs batted in

Pitching

Starting pitchers 
Note: G = Games pitched; IP = Innings pitched; W = Wins; L = Losses; ERA = Earned run average; SO = Strikeouts

Other pitchers 
Note: G = Games pitched; IP = Innings pitched; W = Wins; L = Losses; ERA = Earned run average; SO = Strikeouts

Relief pitchers 
Note: G = Games pitched; W = Wins; L = Losses; SV = Saves; ERA = Earned run average; SO = Strikeouts

Awards and honors 
 Jackie Jensen, Gold Glove Award (OF)
 Frank Malzone, Gold Glove Award (3B)

Farm system 

LEAGUE CHAMPIONS: Minneapolis, Waterloo, Alpine

Source:

See also 
 List of first black Major League Baseball players by team and date

References

External links
1959 Boston Red Sox team at Baseball-Reference
1959 Boston Red Sox season at baseball-almanac.com

Boston Red Sox seasons
Boston Red Sox
Boston Red Sox
1950s in Boston